2O or 2-O may refer to:

2o Sector, see Secondary sector of the economy
2'-O-methylation
2O, IATA code for Island Air Service in Alaska; see Essential Air Service

See also
2OOO, a Sydney, Australia radio station
O2 (disambiguation)
H2O (Molecule)
J20 (disambiguation)
L20 (disambiguation)
N2O (disambiguation)
2O (Atom)
2Q (disambiguation)